The National Society of Film Critics Award for Best Picture is an annual award given by National Society of Film Critics to honor the best film of the year.

History
Since it was established in 1966, the Society has only agreed with the Academy Award for Best Picture nine times: Annie Hall (1977), Unforgiven (1992), Schindler's List (1993), Million Dollar Baby (2004), The Hurt Locker (2009), Spotlight (2015), Moonlight (2016), Parasite (2019), and Nomadland (2020).

Winners

Notes
≠ Academy Award for Best Picture winner
≈ Academy Award for Best Picture nominee
± Not nominated for the Academy Award for Best Picture but received nominations in other categories

1960s

1970s

1980s

1990s

2000s

2010s

2020s

Multiple winners
Ingmar Bergman-3
Robert Altman-2
Clint Eastwood-2
Mike Leigh-2 (one tied with Spike Jonze)
David Lynch-2
Lars von Trier-2
Chloé Zhao-2

References

Awards for best film
National Society of Film Critics Awards
Awards established in 1966
1966 establishments in the United States